Aldo Tamm (born 24 September 1953 Viljandi) is an Estonian politician. 1994–1995, he was Minister of Agriculture. He was a member of VII Riigikogu.

References

Living people
1953 births
Isamaa politicians
Members of the Riigikogu, 1992–1995
Agriculture ministers of Estonia
Voters of the Estonian restoration of Independence
Recipients of the Order of the National Coat of Arms, 3rd Class
Recipients of the Order of the National Coat of Arms, 5th Class
Estonian University of Life Sciences alumni
People from Viljandi